Holothuria (Roweothuria) vemae is a species of sea cucumber first described by Thandar in 1988. It is distributed in the south-eastern Atlantic Ocean, specifically off the coast of South Africa.

References 

Holothuriidae